Rawalts (shown on some maps as Rawalts Station) is a small unincorporated community in Fulton County, Illinois United States, off the Toledo, Peoria and Western Railway, just east of Canton. It was surveyed by Jonas Rawalts. Rawalts had a train station and a store at one time. It is predominantly a farming area.

References

Unincorporated communities in Fulton County, Illinois
Unincorporated communities in Illinois